Wuhan French International School (EFIW) is a French international school in Wuhan, China. It is adjacent to Jianghan University, in Hanyang District. It directly teaches toute petite section through CM2, while it uses the distance education programme from the National Centre for Distance Education (CNED) until terminale S (final year of lycée or senior high school/sixth form college).

History
It opened in September 2008. The French Consulate in Wuhan supported the school's opening. The current  campus opened in April 2014, with a capacity of 300 students.

Student body
As of 2015 the school had 61 students: 43 in primary school and 18 in secondary school.

References

External links

 Wuhan French International School
  

French international schools in China
Education in Wuhan
2008 establishments in China
Educational institutions established in 2008